Arnaldo Tamburini (1843  – 1901) was an Italian painter, with a predilection for painting humorous scenes of tippling monks or anachronistic priests. he was active in Florence. A portrait of Umberto I is found in the Royal Palace of Pisa.

Works
The Monk  Hood Museum of Art, Dartmouth College, New Hampshire

References

1843 births
1901 deaths
19th-century Italian painters
Italian male painters
Italian genre painters
19th-century Italian male artists